Russell Boaden  (born 15 December 1969)  is a Paralympic sailor from Australia.  He won a bronze medal at the 2008 Beijing Paralympics, and a won a gold medal in the Mixed Three Person Sonar the 2016 Rio Paralympics.

Personal
Boaden was born on 15 December 1969. His brachial plexus was damaged as a result of a motorbike accident.

Career
He won a bronze medal at the 2008 Beijing Games in the Mixed Three Person Sonar event. 
At the 2013 IFDS World Championships in Kinsale, Ireland, he teamed with Jonathan Harris and Colin Harrison to win the bronze medal in the Sonar Class.  In October 2013, the trio were named Yachting Australia's Sailors of the Year with a Disability. At the 2014 IFDS World Championships in Halifax, Canada, Boaden teamed with Harrison and Harris to win the bronze medal in the Sonar Class. In November 2014, Boaden shared the Yachting Australia Sailor of the Year with a Disability award with Daniel Fitzgibbon, Liesl Tesch, Colin Harrison, Jonathan Harris and Matthew Bugg. The Australian team of six sailors beat Great Britain by one point at the IFDS World Championship.

At the 2015 IFDS Championships in Australia, he teamed with Colin Harrison and Jonathan Harris to win the silver medal behind the Great Britain crew. Their score was 37.0 to Great Britain's 36.0. Boaden, Harris and Harrison won the bronze medal in the Mixed Three Person Sonar class at the 2016 World Championships held in Medemblik, Netherlands. They won the gold medal in the Mixed Three Person Sonar class at 2016 Summer Paralympics. During the event they had  three first placings and four second placings. He was awarded the Order of Australia Medal in 2017.

References

External links
 
 
 
 

1969 births
Australian sailors
Sailors at the 2008 Summer Paralympics
Sailors at the 2016 Summer Paralympics
Paralympic gold medalists for Australia
Paralympic bronze medalists for Australia
Medalists at the 2008 Summer Paralympics
Medalists at the 2016 Summer Paralympics
Recipients of the Medal of the Order of Australia
Living people
Paralympic medalists in sailing
Paralympic sailors of Australia